In mathematics, a subset  of a linear space  is radial at a given point  if for every  there exists a real  such that for every   

Every radial set is a star domain although not conversely.

Relation to the algebraic interior

The points at which a set is radial are called . 

Relation to absorbing sets

Every absorbing subset is radial at the origin  and if the vector space is real then the converse also holds. That is, a subset of a real vector space is absorbing if and only if it is radial at the origin. 
Some authors use the term radial as a synonym for absorbing.

See also

References

  
  
  

Convex analysis
Functional analysis
Linear algebra
Topology